Paulo Miranda is a given name. It may refer to:

 Paulo Miranda (footballer, born 1974), Brazilian football manager and former defensive midfielder
 Paulo Miranda (footballer, born 1988), Brazilian football centre-back

See also
 Paul Miranda (born 1976), American football cornerback
 Pablo Miranda (born 1984), Argentine football forward
 Pablo De Miranda (born 1986), Argentine football centre-back